WikiCell is a food packaging method where the packaging itself is consumed along with the food contents. According to Bloomberg news, the concept was launched by David Edwards who is a bioengineer which was inspired by "...way a biological cell carries water." The concept is expected to become a major breakthrough as there are many different application including "... everything from yogurt to coffee and even alcoholic drinks." The product is to first be launched in Paris in Europe and in Boston in the United States starting in the Fall of 2013, and to the rest of the world by 2014 as the "Goyum" brand of yogurt and ice cream.

References

Packaging materials